Codex Athous Panteleimon, designated by 052 (in the Gregory-Aland numbering), and known as Uncial 052, is a Greek uncial manuscript of the New Testament. It is dated paleographically to the 10th century.

Description 
The codex contains incomplete text of Revelation of John (7:16-8:12), with a commentary of Andreas's (see Uncial 051), on 4 parchment leaves (29.5 by 23 cm). The text was written in two columns per page, 27 lines per page.

There is also another division according to the λογοι.

The Greek text of this codex is a representative of the Byzantine text-type. Aland placed it in Category V. The text was collated and edited by Herman C. Hoskier.

Currently it is dated by the INTF to the 10th century.

The codex is located on Mount Athos in the library of the Monastery of St Panteleimon (99,2).

See also 

 List of New Testament uncials
 Textual criticism

References

Further reading 
 C. R. Gregory, Textkritik des Neuen Testaments III (Leipzig, 1909), p. 1046. 
 Herman C. Hoskier, Concerning the Text of the Apocalypse (London, 1929), p. 5.

Greek New Testament uncials
10th-century biblical manuscripts
Athos manuscripts
St. Panteleimon Monastery